SS Robert Trimble was a Liberty ship built in the United States during World War II. She was named after Robert Trimble, an Associate Justice of the Supreme Court of the United States.

Construction
Robert Trimble was laid down on 29 August 1942, under a Maritime Commission (MARCOM) contract, MC hull 1493, by J.A. Jones Construction, Brunswick, Georgia, and launched on 21 June 1943.

History
She was allocated to Agwilines, Inc., on 20 July 1943. On 23 December 1946, she was transferred to the Italian Government, which in turn sold her to Socite Di Navigazione Corrado for $544,506, on 27 December 1946. She was renamed Andrea and scrapped in June 1963.

References

Bibliography

 
 
 
 
 

 

Liberty ships
Ships built in Brunswick, Georgia
1943 ships
Liberty ships transferred to Italy